Ceuthophilus guttulosus, or Thomas' camel cricket, is a species of camel cricket in the family Rhaphidophoridae. It was described by Francis Walker in 1869 and is found in North America.

Subspecies
 Ceuthophilus guttulosus angulosus Eades, 1962
 Ceuthophilus guttulosus guttulosus Walker, 1869
 Ceuthophilus guttulosus nigricans Scudder, 1894 (yellow-bellied camel cricket)
 Ceuthophilus guttulosus thomasi Hubbell, 1936

References

 Capinera J.L, Scott R.D., Walker T.J. (2004). Field Guide to Grasshoppers, Katydids, and Crickets of the United States. Cornell University Press.
 Otte, Daniel (2000). "Gryllacrididae, Stenopelmatidae, Cooloolidae, Schizodactylidae, Anostostomatidae, and Rhaphidophoridae". Orthoptera Species File 8, 97.

Further reading

 Arnett, Ross H. (2000). American Insects: A Handbook of the Insects of America North of Mexico. CRC Press.

guttulosus
Insects described in 1869